Aleksandr Andreyevich Radionov (born 30 April 1993) is a Russian football player. He plays for FC Chertanovo Moscow.

Club career
He made his debut in the Russian Professional Football League for FC Strogino Moscow on 4 August 2013 in a game against FC Sever Murmansk.

He made his Russian Football National League debut for FC Chertanovo Moscow on 30 September 2018 in a game against PFC Sochi.

References

1993 births
Living people
Russian footballers
Association football goalkeepers
FC Chertanovo Moscow players
Russian First League players
Russian Second League players
FC Strogino Moscow players